Presidential elections were held in East Timor on 20 March 2017. Incumbent President Taur Matan Ruak, who was eligible for a second term, chose not to run for re-election. The result was a victory for Francisco Guterres of FRETILIN.

Electoral system
The President of East Timor is elected using the two-round system. If it had been required, a second round would have been held on 20 April.

Candidates
José Neves (Independent), a former guerilla leader and was deputy commissioner of the Anti-Corruption Commission (Comissão Anti-Corrupção (CAC)) until July 2016.
António da Conceição (Democratic Party)
José Luís Guterres (Frenti-Mudança)
Amorim Vieira (Independent)
Luís Alves Tilman (Independent)
Francisco Guterres (FRETILIN)
Antonio Maher Lopes (Socialist Party of Timor)
Ángela Freitas (Timorese Labor Party)

Results

References

Further reading

External links

East Timor
2017 in East Timor
East Timor
Presidential elections in East Timor